Izabal Juventud Católica, also known as Juca de Izabal, is a Guatemalan football club based in Puerto Barrios, Izabal Department. 

Nicknamed Los Tiburones (the Sharks), they play their home games in the Estadio Roy Fearon.

History
Izabal were founded in 1951. Most recently they have again been playing in the Primera División Group "A" or "B", but got relegated after the 2009/2010 season.

Current squad

References

Football clubs in Guatemala
1951 establishments in Guatemala